is a railway station located in the town of Wakuya, Miyagi Prefecture, Japan, operated by the East Japan Railway Company (JR East).

Lines
Nonodake Station is served by the Kesennuma Line, and is located 6.2 rail kilometers from the terminus of the line at Maeyachi Station.

Station layout
The station has one ground-level side platform serving a single bi-directional track. The station is unattended.

History
Nonodake Station opened on 24 October 1968. The station was absorbed into the JR East network upon the privatization of the Japan National Railways (JNR) on 1 April 1987.

Passenger statistics
In fiscal 2015, the station was used by an average of 7 passengers daily (boarding passengers only).

Surrounding area
former Kitakami River

See also
 List of Railway Stations in Japan

References

External links

  
  video of a train trip from Rikuzen-Toyosato Station to Maeyachi Station in 2009, passing Nonodake Station at around 03:35 minutes and Wabuchi Station at around 05:48 minutes, without stopping.

Railway stations in Miyagi Prefecture
Kesennuma Line
Railway stations in Japan opened in 1968
Wakuya, Miyagi
Stations of East Japan Railway Company